The Golden Globe Award for Best Television Series – Drama is one of the annual Golden Globe Awards, given to the best drama television series. Documentary series and mini-series are also eligible for this award. From 1962 to 1968, the category was Golden Globe Award for Best Television Series, and grouped musical, comedy and drama series in a single category.

1960s

1970s

1980s

1990s

2000s

2010s

2020s

Series with multiple wins

3 wins
 Mad Men
 The X-Files

2 wins
 The Crown
 Hill Street Blues
 Homeland
 L.A. Law
 Murder, She Wrote
 Northern Exposure
 Succession

Series with multiple nominations

7 nominations
 ER

6 nominations
 Dynasty
 L.A. Law
 Murder, She Wrote

5 nominations
 24
 Columbo
 The Crown
 Dallas
 Game of Thrones
 NYPD Blue
 The Sopranos
 The West Wing

4 nominations
 Cagney & Lacey
 Chicago Hope
 Hart to Hart
 Hill Street Blues
 Law & Order
 Lou Grant
 Mad Men
 Mannix
 St. Elsewhere
 thirtysomething
 The X-Files

3 nominations
 Big Love
 Boardwalk Empire
 CSI: Crime Scene Investigation
 Dexter
 Downton Abbey
 Family
 The Good Wife
 Grey's Anatomy
 House
 Lost
 Marcus Welby, M.D.
 Medical Center
 The Mod Squad
 Northern Exposure
 Police Story
 The Practice
 Six Feet Under
 The Waltons

2 nominations
 Beauty and the Beast
 Beverly Hills, 90210
 Breaking Bad
 Charlie's Angels
 China Beach
 Homeland
 House of Cards
 I'll Fly Away
 In the Heat of the Night
 I Spy
 Kojak
 The Man from U.N.C.L.E.
 Miami Vice
 The Morning Show
 Nip/Tuck
 Ozark
 Party of Five
 Pose
 Stranger Things
 Succession
 This Is Us
 True Blood
 Upstairs, Downstairs
 Wiseguy

Total awards by network

 NBC – 13
 ABC – 11
 CBS – 11
 HBO – 6
 Fox – 5
 AMC – 4
 FX – 3
 Showtime – 3
 Netflix – 2
 Hulu – 1
 ITV – 1
 USA – 1

See also
 Primetime Emmy Award for Outstanding Drama Series
 Screen Actors Guild Award for Outstanding Performance by an Ensemble in a Drama Series
 Critics' Choice Television Award for Best Drama Series

Television Series Drama